The City Municipality of Novo Mesto is a municipality in southeastern Slovenia, close to the border with Croatia. The seat of the municipality is the city of Novo Mesto. The municipality of Novo Mesto is part of the Southeast Slovenia Statistical Region.

Geography

Settlements

In addition to the municipal seat of Novo Mesto, the municipality also includes the following settlements:

 Birčna Vas
 Boričevo
 Brezje
 Brezovica pri Stopičah
 Češča Vas
 Črešnjice
 Črmošnjice pri Stopičah
 Daljni Vrh
 Dobovo
 Dolenja Vas
 Dolenje Grčevje
 Dolenje Kamenje
 Dolenje Karteljevo
 Dolenje Lakovnice
 Dolenji Suhadol
 Dolnja Težka Voda
 Dolž
 Gabrje
 Golušnik
 Gorenje Grčevje
 Gorenje Kamence
 Gorenje Kamenje
 Gorenje Karteljevo
 Gorenje Kronovo
 Gorenje Lakovnice
 Gorenje Mraševo
 Gorenji Suhadol
 Gornja Težka Voda
 Gumberk
 Herinja Vas
 Hrib pri Orehku
 Hrušica
 Hudo
 Iglenik
 Jama
 Jelše pri Otočcu
 Jugorje
 Jurna Vas
 Konec
 Koroška Vas
 Koti
 Križe
 Kuzarjev Kal
 Laze
 Leskovec
 Lešnica
 Lutrško Selo
 Mala Cikava
 Male Brusnice
 Mali Cerovec
 Mali Orehek
 Mali Podljuben
 Mali Slatnik
 Mihovec
 Otočec
 Paha
 Pangrč Grm
 Petane
 Petelinjek
 Plemberk
 Podgrad
 Potov Vrh
 Prečna
 Pristava
 Rajnovšče
 Rakovnik pri Birčni Vasi
 Ratež
 Sela pri Ratežu
 Sela pri Zajčjem Vrhu
 Sela pri Štravberku
 Šentjošt
 Sevno
 Škrjanče pri Novem Mestu
 Smolenja Vas
 Srebrniče
 Srednje Grčevje
 Stopiče
 Stranska Vas
 Štravberk
 Suhor
 Travni Dol
 Trška Gora
 Uršna Sela
 Velike Brusnice
 Veliki Cerovec
 Veliki Orehek
 Veliki Podljuben
 Veliki Slatnik
 Verdun
 Vinja Vas
 Vrh pri Ljubnu
 Vrh pri Pahi
 Vrhe
 Zagrad pri Otočcu
 Zajčji Vrh pri Stopičah
 Ždinja Vas
 Žihovo Selo

Demographics
According to the census of 2002, the municipality has 40,925 inhabitants, 20,017 male and 20,908 female. The average age of the inhabitants is 39.58. There are a total of 13,796 households and 11,408 families. The City Municipality of Novo Mesto has a working-age population of 19,579, of whom 2,118 are unemployed. The average gross monthly wage in August 2003 was €1,099.27 (263,432 tolars) and the average net monthly wage was €687.90 (164,851 tolars). There are 1,725 students in the municipality.

Economy
Today, tourism is increasing in Slovenia, and Novo Mesto is feeling some of the effects of this. The Krka Valley is becoming a place for wine enthusiasts who take tours throughout the Lower Carniola region, tasting locally produced Cviček wine, which is produced by blending several different varieties of local wine.

Major industries include:
 REVOZ (ex Industrija motornih vozil), car manufacturing
 Adria Mobil, caravaning
 Krka (company), pharmaceuticals

See also
 Krka Basketball Club
 Langenhagen - the twin city of Novo Mesto
 Novo Mesto Grammar School

References

External links
 
 City Municipality of Novo Mesto on Geopedia
 Novo Mesto, official municipal web page

 
Novo Mesto
1994 establishments in Slovenia